USS Stamford (PF-95) was a United States Navy  authorized for construction during World War II but cancelled before construction could begin.

Stamford originally was authorized as a patrol gunboat with the hull number PG-203, but she was redesignated as a patrol frigate with the hull number PF-95 on 15 April 1943.  She was assigned the name Stamford on 30 August 1943.

Plans called for Stamford to be built under a Maritime Commission contract by the American Shipbuilding Company at Lorain, Ohio, as a Maritime Commission Type T. S2-S2-AQ1 hull. However, the contract for her construction for the U.S. Navy was cancelled on 31 December 1943 prior to the laying of her keel.

References 

 NavSource Online Frigate (PF) Index
 

Tacoma-class frigates
Cancelled ships of the United States Navy